Lee Edward Russell (born 3 September 1969) is an English former footballer who played in the Football League for Bournemouth, Portsmouth and Torquay United.

References

1969 births
Living people
Footballers from Southampton
Association football defenders
English footballers
Portsmouth F.C. players
AFC Bournemouth players
Torquay United F.C. players
Forest Green Rovers F.C. players
English Football League players